Anders Eriksson (born January 9, 1975) is a Swedish former professional ice hockey player who played in the National Hockey League (NHL). He has represented more NHL teams (8) than any other Swedish hockey players.

Playing career
Eriksson was drafted 22nd overall in the 1993 NHL Entry Draft by the Detroit Red Wings.

In his National Hockey League career, Eriksson has played for the Detroit Red Wings, Chicago Blackhawks, Florida Panthers, Toronto Maple Leafs and Columbus Blue Jackets. He has also played for the St. John's Maple Leafs, Syracuse Crunch and Springfield Falcons of the AHL. In 1999 the Red Wings sent Eriksson and two first round draft picks to the Chicago Blackhawks for defenseman Chris Chelios.

After a two-year absence from the NHL, Eriksson re-signed with the Columbus Blue Jackets on July 2, 2006, for a one-year deal. After a season in Columbus, he then signed with the Calgary Flames. This would be Eriksson's second time signing with the Calgary Flames. He signed a contract in 2004, but never played due to the NHL lockout, but instead played for HV71 in the Swedish Elite League.

On June 26, 2008, Calgary placed him on waivers. After being placed on waivers again by Calgary during training camp and not being picked up he was sent to the Quad City Flames of the American Hockey League.  He was recalled by the Flames for the beginning of the 2009 Stanley Cup playoffs, and appeared in their first game as well as game 6.

Without an NHL club to start the 2009-10 season, Eriksson signed with the San Antonio Rampage of the AHL on December 4, 2009. After appearing in 8 games with the Rampage, Anders was signed by NHL affiliate, the Phoenix Coyotes on December 21, 2009. Eriksson played his first game with the Coyotes the same day in a 5-2 victory over the Blue Jackets.

On March 3, 2010 Eriksson was traded from the Coyotes to the New York Rangers for Miika Wiikman and a 2011 7th round pick. After he was initially assigned to affiliate, the Hartford Wolf Pack, Anders was recalled and made his Rangers debut in a 3-2 loss against the Maple Leafs on March 27, 2010.

On September 27, 2010, Eriksson was invited to the New York Islanders' training camp on a tryout basis. He was released on October 4, 2010. In November 2010, he signed a short-term contract for Timrå IK of the Swedish Elitserien, and played a total of six games for them, before returning to Modo Hockey of the same league on December 19, 2010, the team he played for before his North American career began in 1995.

Career statistics

Regular season and playoffs

International

Awards
 Named Best Defenseman at TV-pucken in 1990.
 Named to the World Junior Championships All Star Team in 1995.
 Named Swedish Rookie of the Year in 1995.
 Stanley Cup champion with Detroit Red Wings in 1998.
 Bronze medal at the World Championships in 1999.

References

External links

1975 births
Calgary Flames players
Chicago Blackhawks players
Columbus Blue Jackets players
Detroit Red Wings draft picks
Detroit Red Wings players
Expatriate ice hockey players in Russia
Florida Panthers players
Hartford Wolf Pack players
Metallurg Magnitogorsk players
HV71 players
Living people
Modo Hockey players
National Hockey League first-round draft picks
New York Rangers players
People from Bollnäs
Phoenix Coyotes players
Quad City Flames players
St. John's Maple Leafs players
San Antonio Rampage players
Springfield Falcons players
Stanley Cup champions
Swedish expatriate ice hockey players in Canada
Swedish expatriate sportspeople in Russia
Swedish expatriate ice hockey players in the United States
Swedish ice hockey defencemen
Syracuse Crunch players
Timrå IK players
Toronto Maple Leafs players
Sportspeople from Gävleborg County